The 1971 U.S. Clay Court Championships was a combined men's and women's tennis tournament that was part of the 1971 Grand Prix circuit and categorized as a Group B event. The event was held in Indianapolis, USA and played on outdoor clay courts. It was the 3rd edition of the tournament in the Open Era and was held in from August 16 through August 22, 1971. Željko Franulović and Billie Jean King won the singles titles.

Finals

Men's singles
 Željko Franulović defeated  Cliff Richey 6–3, 6–4, 0–6, 6–3

Women's singles
 Billie Jean King defeated  Linda Tuero 6–4, 7–5

Men's doubles
 Željko Franulović /  Jan Kodeš defeated  Clark Graebner /  Erik van Dillen 7–6, 5–7, 6–3

Women's doubles
 Judy Dalton /  Billie Jean King defeated  Julie Heldman /  Linda Tuero 6–1, 6–2

References

External links 
 ATP Tournament profile
 ITF Tournament edition details

U.S. Men's Clay Court Championships
U.S. Men's Clay Court Championships
U.S. Men's Clay Court Championships
U.S. Men's Clay Court Championships